Valdimar Þór Ingimundarson (born 28 April 1999) is an Icelandic football midfielder who plays for Sogndal.

Valdimar Þór has been capped six times for Iceland U21.

References

1999 births
Living people
Association football midfielders
Valdimar Thor Ingimundarson
Valdimar Thor Ingimundarson
Strømsgodset Toppfotball players
Valdimar Thor Ingimundarson
Eliteserien players
Valdimar Thor Ingimundarson
Expatriate footballers in Norway
Valdimar Thor Ingimundarson